A red carpet is traditionally used to mark the route taken by heads of state on ceremonial and formal occasions, and has in recent decades been extended to use by VIPs and celebrities at formal events.

History

The earliest known reference to walking a red carpet in literature is in the play Agamemnon by Aeschylus, written in 458 BC.  When the title character returns from Troy, he is greeted by his wife Clytemnestra who offers him a red path to walk upon:

Now, dearest husband, come, step from your chariot. But do not set to earth, my lord, the conquering foot That trod down Troy. Servants, do as you have been bidden; Make haste, carpet his way with crimson tapestries, Spread silk before your master’s feet; Justice herself Shall lead him to a home he never hoped to see.

 Phillip Vellacott, The Oresteian Trilogy, Penguin 1973 (Google Books)

Agamemnon, knowing that only gods walk on such luxury, responds with trepidation:

I am a mortal, a man; I cannot trample upon these tinted splendors without fear thrown in my path.

Oriental carpets in Renaissance painting often show rugs and carpets, patterned but with red often the main background colour, laid on the steps to a throne, or on a dais where rulers or sacred figures are placed.

A red carpet was rolled out to a river to welcome the arrival of United States president James Monroe in 1821.  In 1902, the New York Central Railroad began using plush crimson carpets to direct people as they boarded their 20th Century Limited passenger train.  This is believed to be the origin of the phrase "red-carpet treatment".

By the late 1920s the red carpet had become synonymous with Hollywood and film premieres. A crimson-hued carpet was used for the first ever Hollywood premiere, the 1922 premiere of Robin Hood, starring Douglas Fairbanks, in front of the Egyptian Theatre. For the following decades, the red carpet was one of the few places the public could catch a glimpse of stars like Clark Gable, Jimmy Stewart and Grace Kelly.

In 1961, the red carpet was introduced at the Academy Awards at the Santa Monica Civic Auditorium. In 1964, the broadcasters of the ceremony opted to film outside the venue, showing the arrival of guests as they stepped out of their limousines. From this point forward, the red carpet became a globally acknowledged focal point for actors and actresses to make a grand entrance and showcase themselves at the Oscars.

Publicity events
A red carpet is also used in gala celebrity events such as the Academy Awards, Golden Globe Awards, Grammy Awards, Met Gala, and BAFTAs. While the awards take place inside, much of the publicity and excitement takes place outside with journalists discussing the red carpet fashions, what designers are being worn by which stars and photographers taking pictures. This is now a spectacular international product placement arena of great importance to the fashion industry. Red carpets are often coupled with publicity backdrops which contain brand logos or emblems for photography purposes.

Carpeting in other colors may replace red in some instances to honor a certain cause or for a sponsored event, the sponsor's logo colors, such as a "green carpet" to promote environmental awareness, or for the Nickelodeon Kids' Choice Awards, an orange carpet is used instead to go with the network's primary imaging color. MTV uses a blue colored carpet for their Video Music Awards. In 2019, the premiere of the film Detective Pikachu used a yellow carpet to match the color of Pikachu. Likewise, the premiere of Sonic the Hedgehog used a blue carpet. At the 95th Academy Awards, the organizers chose a different champagne color for the first time since the red carpet was introduced, as part of an attempt to better reflect a "day event into the night". The 2022 American Music Awards used a black carpet.

In some countries such as South Africa and the Philippines, a red carpet is laid for members of parliament and other guests entering the joint session, allowing a showcase of fashion for politicians.

Phrases
More generally, "red carpet treatment" and "rolling out the red carpet" usually refer to any special efforts made in the interests of hospitality.

Airline lounges
United Airlines operates a series of airport lounges at major airports that were formerly known as "Red Carpet Clubs".

See also
 Red carpet fashion

References

Rugs and carpets